Jacob Erratt (November 16, 1847 - April 28, 1928) was mayor of the city of Ottawa, Ontario, Canada from 1889 to 1890.

He was born in West Winchester, Ontario and came to Ottawa in 1869. He owned a furniture store in the city. He served on city council from 1882 to 1884. In 1888, he was named acting mayor. During his term as mayor, he served on the board of the Central Canada Exhibition Association. He also was a member of the Provisional Committee of the Lady Stanley institute for Trained Nurses  at its incorporation in Ottawa in 1890. In 1902, he moved to Moose Jaw, Saskatchewan, where he opened a real estate office; he died there in 1928.

References

Chain of Office: Biographical Sketches of the Early Mayors of Ottawa (1847-1948), Dave Mullington

1840s births
1928 deaths
Mayors of Ottawa
Year of birth uncertain